Dooriyaan is a 1979 Bollywood film directed by Bhimsain Khurana and written by Shanker Shesh.It starred Uttam Kumar and Sharmila Tagore

Plot

Cast
Uttam Kumar as Kailash
Sharmila Tagore as Ratna
Shreeram Lagoo as Prabhakar 
Jalal Agha as Newspaper Vendor
Kireet Khurana as Moju
Sulabha Deshpande as Maid
Arvind Deshpande
Priyadarshinee as Laxmi

Soundtrack
The music of the film was composed by Jaidev.

"Zindagi Me Jab Tumhaare Gam Nahin The" - Bhupinder Singh, Anuradha Paudwal
"Zindagi Zindagi Mere Ghar Aanaa" - Bhupinder Singh, Anuradha
"Evening News, Bees Bees Paise Nikalo Bhai" - Manna Dey
"Khota Paisa Nahi Chalega Nahi Chala Hai Nahi Chalega" - K N Sharma, Ranu Mukherjee, Preeti Sagar

References

External links
 

1979 films
1970s Hindi-language films
1977 films
Films scored by Jaidev